The 2020 Ondo State gubernatorial election was held on 10 October 2020. Incumbent APC governor Rotimi Akeredolu won re-election for a second term, defeating PDP Eyitayo Jegede, ZLP Agboola Ajayi and several minor party candidates.

Rotimi Akeredolu was the APC candidate. He picked Lucky Ayedatiwa as his running mate.

Eyitayo Jegede was the PDP candidate with Gboluga Ikengboju as his running mate. Agboola Ajayi was the ZLP candidate with Gboye Adegbenro as his running mate. Adedapo Benjamin Adelegan stood in for ADC in the polls, while Dotun Ojon represented YPP. 17 candidates contested in the election, all were male, while 2 of the deputy governorship candidates were female.

Electoral system
The Governor of Ondo State is elected using the plurality voting system.

Primary election

APC primary
The APC primary election was held on July 20, 2020. Rotimi Akeredolu, the incumbent governor won the primary election polling 2,725 votes against 7 other candidates. His closest rival was Olusola Oke, a former governorship aspirant in the state who came a distant second with 262 votes, while lsaac Kekemeke, came third with 19 votes.

Candidates
Party nominee: Rotimi Akeredolu: Incumbent governor.
Running mate: Lucky Ayedatiwa.
Olusola Oke: Former governorship aspirant. Lost in the primary election.
lsaac Kekemeke: Lost in the primary election.
Jumoke Anifowose: Lost in the primary election.
Olayide Adelami: Lost in the primary election.
Sola Iji: Lost in the primary election.
Awodeyi Akinsehinwa: Lost in the primary election.
Bukola Adetula: Lost in the primary election.

PDP primary
The PDP primary election was held on July 22, 2020. Eyitayo Jegede won the primary election polling 888 votes against 7 other candidates. His closest rival was Agboola Ajayi, deputy governor in the state who came second with 675 votes, while Eddy Olafeso, a former vice chairman of the party in the state came a distant third with 175 votes.

Candidates
Party nominee: Eyitayo Jegede.
Running mate: Gboluga Ikengboju.
Agboola Ajayi: Deputy governor. Lost in the primary election.
Eddy Olafeso: Former vice chairman of the party in the state. Lost in the primary election.
Bode Ayorinde: Former member of the House of Representatives. Lost in the primary election.
Banji Okunomo: Lost in the primary election.
Sola Ebiseni: Former commissioner. Lost in the primary election.
Godday Erewa: Lost in the primary election.
Boluwaji Kunlere: Lost in the primary election.

Results
A total of 17 candidates registered with the Independent National Electoral Commission to contest in the election. APC Governor Rotimi Akeredolu won re-election for a second term, defeating PDP Eyitayo Jegede, ZLP Agboola Ajayi and several minor party candidates. Akeredolu received 51.1% of the votes, Jegede received 34.2%, while Ajayi received 12.1%.

The total number of registered voters in the state was 1,812,634 while 595,213 voters were accredited. Total number of votes cast was 591,193, while number of valid votes was 572,745. Rejected votes were 18,448.

By local government area
Here are the results of the election by local government area for the two major parties. The total valid votes of 572,745 represents the 17 political parties that participated in the election. Blue represents LGAs won by Akeredolu. Green represents LGAs won by Jegede.

Aftermath
Later in October, Jegede officially challenged the results at the Ondo State Election Petitions Tribunal based on four alleged issues: irregularities in the results, violence, intimidation of voters, and improper holding of the APC primary. This challenge was filed as Akeredolu had already set up a 25-member inaugural committee headed by Deputy Governor-elect Lucky Aiyedatiwa. The Tribunal held first its proceedings on the case on November 4 and its inaugural sitting on December 8, which was met with considerable violence between APC and PDP supporters outside the High Court Complex. After Akeredolu was sworn-in for a second term in office on February 24, 2021, the Tribunal reached an April 20 verdict in favor of Akeredolu by dismissing Jegede’s petition for lack of merit. 

After the verdict, Akeredolu told Jegede to join him in uniting Ondo and to avoid further litigation, however, the Ondo State PDP said it would appeal the tribunal's decision. The PDP appeal to the Court of Appeal in Akure failed as well with the court's Justice Theresa Orji-Abadua-led five-member panel dismissing their case. however, the Ondo State PDP said it would appeal the tribunal's decision. Nonetheless, the Ondo PDP immediately announced that they would appeal to the Supreme Court while Akeredolu once again called for Jegede to avoid litigation to unite the state and claimed that Jegede will lose at the Supreme Court as well.

On July 28, 2021, a seven-member panel of the Supreme Court upheld the decisions of the Court of Appeal and Ondo State Election Petitions Tribunal in a 4-3 decision. The majority opinion stated that while Jegede may have been correct in that Mai Mala Buni was not legitimately the national APC Caretaker Chairman and thus could not nominate Akeredolu, since Jegede failed to name Buni in the appeal, it must be dismissed. The dissenting opinion held that since the APC itself was named in the case, the appeal could have been heard. After the ruling, Jegede finally conceded while Akeredolu praised the judiciary and his legal team. The parties reacted similarly, with the APC commending the decision while the PDP stated its respect for the judiciary but claimed that the reason for the decision effectively vindicated their case.

References

Ondo State gubernatorial election
Ondo State gubernatorial elections
Ondo